Diagoniella is a genus of sponge known from the Middle Cambrian Burgess Shale. 128 specimens of Diagoniella are known from the Greater Phyllopod bed, where they comprise 0.24% of the community.

References

Hexactinellida genera
Prehistoric sponge genera
Burgess Shale fossils
Fossil taxa described in 1920
Cambrian genus extinctions
Wheeler Shale